Symphyotrichum walteri (formerly Aster walteri) is a species of flowering plant in the family Asteraceae native to the southeastern United States. Its flowers have bluish-purple ray florets and yellow disk florets.

Citations

References

walteri
Flora of the Southeastern United States
Plants described in 1933
Taxa named by Edward Johnston Alexander